The Priory Church of Saint Peter and Saint Paul, Athenry, also called Athenry Priory, is a medieval Dominican priory and National Monument located in Athenry, Ireland.

Location

Athenry Abbey is located in the eastern part of Athenry, east of the Clarinbridge River.

History

Meyler de Bermingham was the founder in 1241. Other local notables funded it: Feidlim Ua Conchobair, King of Connacht built the refectory; Owen Ó hEidhin (King of Uí Fiachrach Aidhne) built the dormitory and Conchobar Ó Cellaigh of Uí Maine the chapter house. The priory initially stood on the edge of the town walls, but was later enveloped by them.

A provincial chapter was held at Athenry in 1242. Flann Mac Flainn, Archbishop of Tuam, built a house for scholars in the 1250s. Founder Meyler was buried in the priory in 1252. His son William de Bermingham was Archbishop of Tuam; he had a dispute with the monastery in 1297 but was buried there in 1312.

The refectory (now destroyed) was built around 1265, with the chapel completed before 1340.

In 1324, William Liath de Burgh left money to enlarge the church and priory, a task completed by 1345. Joanna de Ruffur died in 1408 and left money to construct a new east window and windows in the choir.

Athenry Priory was burned in 1423; indulgences were granted by Pope Martin V and Pope Eugene IV to those who contributed to its repair. 1451, the friars built a chapel on land north of the river at Carrowardahrah, granted by Ulick Ruadh Burke.

The monastery was dissolved in 1574.

Athenry Abbey was burned during the uprising of William mac an Iarla Burke in the 1570s. Regular Observant Friars reoccupied it 1595–7.

In the 1640s the historian James Ware acquired the Register of the priory.

Athenry was re-revived as a university in 1644, before being shut down by Cromwellians in 1652. The friars last occupied Athenry priory between 1685 and 1698.

In the 18th century the priory was used as a military barracks. The last de Bermingham to be buried at Athenry was Lady Mathilda Bermingham (d. 1788). The tower collapsed around 1790. Lady Mathilda's tomb, a Coade stone monument, was broken into in 2002, perhaps by thieves.

Buildings
The remains consist of nave, chancel and a northern aisle and transept, and tombs from the 13th–15th centuries.

The tall lancet windows in the chancel are probably 13th century while the remainder is 14th century.

References

Dominican monasteries in the Republic of Ireland
Religion in County Galway
Archaeological sites in County Galway
National Monuments in County Galway